In mathematics, specifically in order theory and functional analysis, an abstract L-space, an AL-space, or an abstract Lebesgue space is a Banach lattice  whose norm is additive on the positive cone of X.

In probability theory, it means the standard probability space.

Examples 

The strong dual of an AM-space with unit is an AL-space.

Properties 

The reason for the name abstract L-space is because every AL-space is isomorphic (as a Banach lattice) with some subspace of 
Every AL-space X is an order complete vector lattice of minimal type; 
however, the order dual of X, denoted by X+, is not of minimal type unless X is finite-dimensional.  
Each order interval in an AL-space is weakly compact.

The strong dual of an AL-space is an AM-space with unit. 
furthermore, under the evaluation map, X is isomorphic with the band of all real Radon measures 𝜇 on K such that for every majorized and directed subset S of  we have

See also

References

  

Functional analysis